Hundra is a 1983 Italian-American-Spanish fantasy film co-written and directed by Matt Cimber and starring Laurene Landon.

Plot 
Hundra belongs to a tribe of Amazons. She is the only tribe member of her age who has never been with a man. She declares she will keep it like that. One day when she goes hunting, her tribe is outnumbered and slaughtered by barbarians. As the only survivor she travels to an old wise woman and asks her for advice, but to her surprise she is told she ought to become a mother in order to prevent the final extinction of the Amazons.

Hundra seeks a father for her child. The first candidate has bad manners and it turns out that he is suffering from a sadistic personality disorder. While she continues her search she is confronted by a murderous robber baron who only wants to kill her. Later she encounters an effeminate pimp. Eventually she gets to know a gentleman who works as a healer. She asks him to become the father of her child but she is told that a man won't get in the right mood if he is approached too bluntly. Hundra asks other women to help her to live up to his expectations. She succeeds in seducing him, gets pregnant and delivers a child.

An evil pagan priest kidnaps Hundra's daughter. Thus Hundra is coerced into joining a sinister ritual where the priest's followers humiliate her. During this session she is informed that her new friends have freed the child. She fights back and returns to her home lands. The female narrator explains there was proof that Hundra's spirit kept on living in all women ever since.

Cast 
 Laurene Landon ... Hundra
 John Ghaffari ... Napatkin
 María Casal ... Drachima
 Ramiro Oliveros ... Pateray
 Luis Lorenzo ... Rotahar
 Tamara ... Chrysula
 Victor Gans ... Landrazza
 Cristina Torres ... Shandrom
 Bettina Brenner ... Hundra's mother
 Maria Vico ... The midwife
 Fernando Bilbao ... Torente
 Jorge Bosso Gordoza
 Azucena Hernández
 Frank Braña ... Chieftain

Production 
There was a stunt double for the nude scene, which Laurene Landon originally wasn't going to do, but she was short and heavy. "They had her in the water because I wasn't going to show my boobs. She was maybe five-feet-five. I think Matt Cimber did that on purpose to get me to do that nude scene in the water. I saw the footage of that and said, 'That's not me. My ass isn't that big. I'll do it myself'," Landon said.

Reception 
Paul Mavis of Dvdtalk.com described Hundra as a "genial, rollicking, comic book sword and sandals fantasy" and argued for the film's cult status.
"Monster Pictures" stated "Hundra" was "one of the great underrated films of the era".  John Shatzer of BloodTypeOnline.com wrote a negative review but gave Hundra credit by saying a few action scenes were exciting. Judge David Johnson of DVD Verdict instead regarded the action scenes and Landon's general performance as "stilted," only allowing the film's "camp" value. Keith Breese of Filmcritic.com praised Laurene Landon as "a striking action lead" and compared Hundra to "Xena".

Comparison to contemporary genre films 
Mondo-Digital categorised Hundra as one of the better contemporary copies of Conan the Barbarian and pointed out that Hundra preceded the film adaptation of Red Sonja. Richard Scheib of Moria.co.nz called Hundra a "better incarnation of the spirit of the Red Sonja stories than the Red Sonja (1985) film ever was". Landon herself called the film "a female version of Conan the Barbarian".

DVD release 
In 2007 the DVD label Subversive published "Hundra" with a commentary by Matt Cimber and Laurene Landon and a making-of. The edition also includes a comic book and Ennio Morricone's soundtrack on a CD. Andrew Borntreger of badmovies.org complained about missing subtitles and closing credits being hard to read. Jonathan Doyle of media-party.com criticised the anamorphic transfer and the sound quality of what he called a "cult oddity".

References

External links 
 
 
 
 
 Trailer

1983 films
1980s action adventure films
1980s fantasy action films
1980s fantasy adventure films
Films set in a fictional country
Films directed by Matt Cimber
Films scored by Ennio Morricone
1980s English-language films
English-language Italian films
English-language Spanish films
1980s Spanish-language films
Films shot in Almería
American fantasy action films
Peplum films
American sword and sorcery films
Sword and sandal films
American multilingual films
Spanish multilingual films
1983 multilingual films
Spanish fantasy adventure films
American fantasy adventure films
1980s American films
1980s Italian films